Otryt is a mountain range in the Bieszczady Mountains  of south-eastern Poland. It is located north of the San river. Its highest point is Trohaniec (939 m). Otryt is a long, straight ridge, approx. 18 km long, covered with fir and beech forests.

Mountain ranges of Poland